The Tuareg rebellion of 1962–1964, sometimes called the First Tuareg Rebellion or the Alfellaga, was an insurgency by populations of what is now northern Mali begun shortly after the nation achieved independence from France in 1960. This short revolt could only be suppressed with the entry into the conflict of Morocco and Algeria in 1963, which handed over the 35 leaders of the counter-rebellion, then imposed a military authority on the Tuareg regions.

Many in the sparsely populated and ethnically distinct north of Mali along with some in southern Algeria and northern Niger expected an independent Tuareg, Berber, and Arab nation to be formed by the Sahara desert regions when French Colonialism ended. This combined with dissatisfaction over the new government led some Tuareg in Northern Mali to rebel in 1963.

The first Tuareg attacks began in northern Mali in early 1962 with small, “hit and run” raids against government targets. The attacks escalated in size and destructiveness through 1963, resulting in very unsettled conditions in the Tuareg-populated north.

However, the Tuareg attacks did not reflect a unified leadership, a well-coordinated strategy or clear evidence of a coherent strategic vision. The insurgents generally depended on their camels for transportation and were equipped mainly with unsophisticated and rather old small arms, unlike the Malian armies who owned Soviet weapons, and the support of Algeria and Morocco. They also failed to mobilize the Tuareg community as a whole. While estimates of their numbers are highly speculative, it is unlikely that rebel combatants ever numbered more than about 1,500.

Still, the government reacted quickly and harshly. Mali's army, well-motivated and now well-equipped with new Soviet weapons, conducted vigorous counterinsurgency operations. By the end of 1964, the government's strongarm methods had crushed the rebellion. It then placed the Tuareg-populated northern regions under a repressive military administration. Many of Mali's Tuareg fled as refugees to neighboring countries. While the government had succeeded in ending the rebellion, its coercive measures alienated many Tuaregs who had not supported the insurgents. Atrocities and human rights abuses on both sides contributed to a climate of fear and distrust in the north. And while the government subsequently announced a number of programs to improve local infrastructure and economic opportunity, it lacked the resources to follow through on most of them. As a result, Tuareg grievances remained largely unaddressed, and a seething resentment continued in many Tuareg communities after 1964. Clearly, the problem of instability in the north had simply been deferred, not resolved.

References

External links
Cartogracy: Tuareg Independence Movement

Rebellions in Mali
Conflicts in 1962
Conflicts in 1963
Conflicts in 1964
1960s in Mali
Rebellions in Africa
Tuareg rebellions
Berberism
Wars involving Mali
20th-century rebellions
1961 in Mali
1962 in Mali
1963 in Mali
1964 in Mali